Piffione (Piffiù in Lombard language) is a hamlet of Borgosatollo, an Italian small village in the province of Brescia, in Lombardy.

Geography 
It is located on the provincial road 23 between Borgosatollo and Montirone.

The position of the hamlet is attested by some historical maps since the seventeenth century.

The village is adjacent to the irrigation ditch Piffiona, from which it gets its name.

Main sights 
 Church of St. Michael the Archangel, probably of Longobard origin
 Modonesi's Palace

References

Frazioni of the Province of Brescia